Dave Maurer (March 18, 1932 – July 30, 2011) was an American football player, coach, and college athletics administrator.  He served as the head football coach at Wittenberg University from 1969 to 1983, compiling a record of 129–23–3.  His teams won the NCAA Division III Football Championship in 1973 and 1975, and were runners-up in 1978 and 1979.  Maurer was inducted into the College Football Hall of Fame in 1991 as a coach.  He died on July 30, 2011 at the Eaglewood Care Center in Springfield, Ohio.

Head coaching record

References

External links
 

1932 births
2011 deaths
Denison Big Red football players
Denison Big Red men's basketball players
Wittenberg Tigers athletic directors
Wittenberg Tigers football coaches
College Football Hall of Fame inductees
People from Duquesne, Pennsylvania
Players of American football from Pennsylvania
American men's basketball players